Iberodes linifolia (syn. Omphalodes linifolia), also known as Venus's navelwort, white-flower navelwort and petite bourrache, is an annual species of flowering plant native to the Iberian Peninsula and western France, but has naturalized elsewhere in Europe, North Africa, North America and Chile. It is distributed throughout dry open areas in full sun.

The Latin specific epithet linifolia means “with leaves like flax (Linum)”.

Under the name Omphalodes linifolia, this plant has gained the Royal Horticultural Society's Award of Garden Merit.

References

Annual plants
Flora of Southwestern Europe
Flora of Africa
Flora of Europe
Garden plants